Thekla Kaischauri mononymously known by her ring name Thekla is an Austrian professional wrestler currently working for World Wonder Ring Stardom. She is also known known for her tenure with the Japanese promotion Ice Ribbon.

Professional wrestling career

Independent circuit (2018–present)
Kaischauri made her professional wrestling debut in the Austrian underground scene, which was sited by the pro wrestler on Cathy Cat’s YouTube channel where she was interviewed recently. She also mentioned this in a vienna.info ten question interview (cited). 

As part freelancer, Kaischauri is known for competing in multiple promotions of the Japanese independent scene. On July 18, 2021, she competed at a house show promoted by World Woman Pro-Wrestling Diana where she teamed up with Shizuku Tsukata in a losing effort against Crysis (Ayako Sato and Jaguar Yokota). On Seadlinnng's 6th Anniversary Show from August 19, 2021, she unsuccessfully faced Leon in a high-speed match. At FMW-E Sky High, an event promoted by Frontier Martial-Arts Wrestling on October 24, 2021, she fell short to Akane Fujita in the first-round of the Women's Current Blast Princess Tournament. At Gleat G PROWRESTLING Ver. 10 on November 26, 2021, she teamed up with Yappy in a losing effort against Akane Fujita and Michiko Miyagi.

Ice Ribbon (2019–2021) 
Kaischauri moved to Japan and began working for Ice Ribbon, promotion where she competed for most of her career. She made her first appearance at New Ice Ribbon #973, an event promoted on July 27, 2019, where she teamed up with Hamuko Hoshi and Suzu Suzuki in a losing effort against Asahi, Matsuya Uno and Tsukasa Fujimoto as a result of a six-woman tag team match. At New Ice Ribbon #1047 on June 20, 2020, she competed in a 14-woman gauntlet match also involving Maika Ozaki, Hamuko Hoshi, Hiragi Kurumi, Matsuya Uno and others. She also moved up to title images. At New Ice Ribbon #1101 on February 23, 2021, she unsuccessfully challenged Tsukushi Haruka for the IW19 Championship. At New Ice Ribbon #1109 on April 21, 2021, she unsuccessfully challenged Risa Sera for the FantastICE Championship.

World Wonder Ring Stardom (2021–present) 
Kaischauri and Mirai Maiumi from Tokyo Joshi Pro Wrestling kept attacking various wrestlers from World Wonder Ring Stardom under masks from the beginning of the first event of the Stardom Super Wars trilogy which took place from November 3 to December 18, 2021. Giulia would announce on December 25, 2021, that both of the masked superstars will join her Donna Del Mondo unit at the beginning of 2022. On January 3, 2022, at Stardom Award in Shinjuku, Kaischauri and Mirai were officially presented as the mysterious silhouettes as they teamed up with her to defeat Cosmic Angels' sub-unit of Tam Nakano, Unagi Sayaka and Mai Sakurai.

At Stardom Nagoya Supreme Fight on January 29, 2022, Thekla defeated Mina Shirakawa for the vacant SWA World Championship. At Stardom Cinderella Journey on February 23, 2022, Thekla teamed up with Giulia & Mirai to wrestle fellow stablemates Syuri, Maika & Himeka into a time-limit draw in a Six-Woman Tag Team Match. On the first night of the Stardom World Climax 2022 from March 26, Thekla teamed up with Maika in a losing effort against Prominence's Risa Sera and Suzu Suzuki. On the second night from March 27, she teamed with Giulia, Maika & Himeka to defeat the whole Prominence team formed by Risa Sera, Suzu Suzuki, Mochi Miyagi & Akane Fujita. Kaischauri took part of the Stardom Cinderella Tournament 2022 where she fell short to stablemate Giulia in the first rounds from April 3. At Stardom Golden Week Fight Tour on May 5, 2022, she dropped the SWA World Championship to Mayu Iwatani. At Stardom Flashing Champions on May 28, 2022, she unsuccessfully challenged AZM for the High Speed Championship. At Stardom Mid Summer Champions on July 9, 2022, Kaischauri is set to team up with Giulia, Maika, Himeka, Natsupoi and Mai Sakurai to face Cosmic Angels (Tam Nakano, Unagi Sayaka, Mina Shirakawa, Saki, Hikari Shimizu and Yuko Sakurai) in a 12-woman elimination tag team match. She was also announced as one of the Stardom 5 Star Grand Prix 2022 participants, following to compete in the Red Stars Block where she is going to face Syuri, Tam Nakano, Utami Hayashishita, AZM, Koguma, Maika, Himeka, Unagi Sayaka, Saki Kashima, Mai Sakurai, Risa Sera and Saki.

Championships and accomplishments
Ice Ribbon
Triangle Ribbon Championship (1 time)
WUW World Underground Wrestling Women's Championship (1 time)
Pro Wrestling Illustrated
 Ranked No. 69 of the top 150 female wrestlers in the PWI Women's 150 in 2022
World Wonder Ring Stardom
SWA World Championship (1 time)

References 

1993 births
21st-century professional wrestlers
Austrian expatriate sportspeople in Japan
Austrian female professional wrestlers
Expatriate professional wrestlers in Japan
Living people
Sportspeople from Vienna
SWA World Champions